Rajshahi-6 is a constituency represented in the Jatiya Sangsad (National Parliament) of Bangladesh since 2008 by Shahriar Alam of the Awami League.

Boundaries 
The constituency encompasses Bagha and Charghat Upazilas.

History 
The constituency was created from the former Rajshahi-5 constituency when, ahead of the 2008 general election, the Election Commission redrew constituency boundaries to reflect population changes revealed by the 2001 Bangladesh census. The 2008 reapportionment transferred one seat from Sirajganj District to Rajshahi District. The new seat took the name Rajshahi-3, bumping up by one the suffix of the former constituency of that name and higher numbered constituencies in the district.

Members of Parliament

Elections

Elections in the 2010s

Elections in the 2000s

References

External links
 

Parliamentary constituencies in Bangladesh
Rajshahi District